BRP Filipino Flojo (PC-386) is the fifteenth ship of the   coastal patrol craft of the Philippine Navy. It is part of the second batch of its class ordered through US Foreign Military Sales (FMS) in 1993, and was commissioned with the Philippine Navy on 22 May 1996. She is currently in active service with the Littoral Combat Force, Philippine Fleet.

t was initially designated as Fast Patrol Craft, and was numbered "DF-386", but later on was re-designated as a Patrol Gunboat, and was finally re-numbered as "PG-386". Another round of reclassification was made in April 2016, which redesignated the patrol gunboat as the coastal patrol craft "PC-386".

History 
In 1989, the Philippines placed an order of 4 fast patrol craft with Trinity-Equitable (formerly Halter-Marine Equitable) for USD9.4 million. The first of the four vessels, arrived on August 20, 1990, was named . The lead ship of the class was named after Jose Andrada, who was one of the original officers of the Offshore Patrol of the Philippine Commonwealth government. In April 1990, the Philippines ordered an additional ship and 3 more ships in August 1990. In March 1993, eleven more vessels were ordered. A total of 22 ships were acquired by the Philippine Navy by 1999.

Ship Design 
Her class was built to U.S. Coast Guard standards, with an aluminum hull and superstructure. In addition, a 4-meter rigid inflatable boat powered by a 40-hp outboard motor is stowed amidships. She has a complement of 12. The ship is equipped with a Raytheon AN/SPS-64(V)11 Navigation/Surface Search Radar, but with a smaller antenna as those used in bigger Philippine Navy ships. Like all other Philippine Navy ships, the entire class was installed with the Philippine Navy Vessel Tracking System (VTS) by the Naval Sea Systems Command.

Armament 
The ships of her class are armed with one 25mm Bushmaster chain gun on Mk.38 Mod.0 mount on second and later batches (PG-379 to PG-395), four M2HB Browning 12.7 mm/50 caliber machine guns on Mk.26 mounts, with two positioned forward and two aft; and two M60 7.62 mm/30 caliber machine guns, both mounted amidships. The ship can carry 4,000 rounds of 12.7 mm and 2,000 rounds of 7.62 mm ammunition. A large "Big Eyes" binocular is also carried on tripod mounts, one on the forecastle and one just abaft the mast.

Propulsion 

Operational history 

The RAN sent the vessels HMAS Albany (ACPB 86) and HMAS Glenelg (ACPB 96) for the exercise.

References 

1990s ships
Ships of the Philippine Navy